Matthew Wilson is a British rally driver.

Matthew Wilson may also refer to:

Entertainment
 Matt Wilson (artist), American artist known for his work on role-playing games
 Matt Wilson (comics artist), American comic book colorist
 Matt Wilson (singer) (born 1963), of Trip Shakespeare and the Flops
 Matt Wilson (jazz drummer) (born 1964), American jazz drummer
 Matt Wilson (Home and Away), a fictional character in the Australian soap opera

Sports
 Matt Wilson (footballer) (1842–1897), Irish international footballer of 1880s
 Matt Wilson (racing driver) (born 1984), American racing driver
 Matthew Wilson (cyclist) (born 1977), Australian road cyclist
 Matthew Wilson (swimmer) (born 1998), Australian swimmer

Other
 Matthew Wilson (politician) (born 1984), Georgia state representative
 Matthew Wilson (gardener), garden designer, writer and broadcaster
 Matthew J. Wilson, president of the University of Akron, 2016–2018
 Matt Wilson (crater), elliptical crater in the Northern Territory, Australia

See also